Year 145 (CXLV) was a common year starting on Thursday (link will display the full calendar) of the Julian calendar. At the time, it was known as the Year of the Consulship of Hadrianus and Caesar (or, less frequently, year 898 Ab urbe condita). The denomination 145 for this year has been used since the early medieval period, when the Anno Domini calendar era became the prevalent method in Europe for naming years.

Events

By place

Roman Empire 
 Antoninus Augustus Pius and Marcus Aurelius Caesar become Roman Consuls.
 Marcus Aurelius marries Faustina the Younger, the daughter of Antoninus Pius.
 Arrian becomes archon in Athens.

Asia 
 Change of emperor from Han Chongdi to Han Zhidi of the Chinese Han Dynasty.

Births 
 April 11 – Septimius Severus, Roman emperor (d. 211)

Deaths 
 Han Chongdi, Chinese emperor of the Han Dynasty (b. 143)

References